George Edward Cumby (born July 5, 1956) is a former American football player who was a linebacker in the National Football League (NFL) for eight seasons during the 1980s.  He played college football for the University of Oklahoma, and was a three-time All-American.  A first-round pick in the 1980 NFL Draft, Cumby played professionally for the Green Bay Packers, Buffalo Bills, and Philadelphia Eagles of the NFL. He was an athletic director and head football coach for Bishop Thomas K. Gorman Catholic School in Tyler, Texas.  Since August 2016, he has been director of recruitment at Jacksonville College (TX).

Cumby has coached college football  at Texas College, and Tyler Junior College. He has coached at his alma mater Tyler- Bishop T.K . Gorman for two stints and at All Saints Episcopal  School in Tyler.

Early years
Cumby is African-American. He was born in LaRue, Texas.  He graduated from Bishop Thomas K. Gorman Catholic School in Tyler, Texas in 1975.

College career
He attended the University of Oklahoma, where he played for the Oklahoma Sooners football team from 1976 to 1979.  He was a three-time first-team All-American (1977, 1978, 1979), being a consensus first-team selection in 1979.  With a combination of speed and strength, he is considered one of the top defensive players of all time at Oklahoma. He was also named Defensive Newcomer of the Year and Big Eight Defensive Player of the Year twice—in 1978 and 1979. Cumby was described by then-head coach Barry Switzer as "the only person I know who could go one-on-one with Earl Campbell and knock him backwards." He finished his career at Oklahoma with 405 career tackles, fifth on the all-time list.

Professional career
He was taken in the first round by the Green Bay Packers in the 1980 NFL Draft as the 26th overall pick. He started two games as a rookie and moved into the full-time starting position in 1981 when he intercepted a career-high three passes and in 1982 Cumby was a Second-team All-Pro selection. He remained a starter though 1984 and was then relegated to backup duty in 1985.

In the 1985 season Cumby gained national attention in a negative way. When rookie defensive tackle William Perry was put in the offensive lineup for the Chicago Bears it was Cumby who was twice "flattened" by Perry on lead blocks for Walter Payton. Later in that season, Cumby was beaten on a short pass route by Perry that the "Fridge" carried into the end zone, again an embarrassment for Cumby.
 
Cumby was cut by the Packers the following preseason on August 18, 1986, and subsequently signed by the Buffalo Bills. Cumby was a starter in 8 of the 11 games he played in 1986. He played one game for the Philadelphia Eagles in 1987 when he was signed to bolster an injury-weakened linebacking corps.

Worked for Sports World ministries from 1987 to 1989, traveling around the United States speaking to schools churches and corporations.

Cumby was ordained and licensed to preach in 1999.

Served as a leader of Fellowship of Christian athletes for seven years 1999 to 2006 primarily in the Houston area.

In 2001 started his first church called Family Of Faith Worship Center in Houston until 2006.

Cumby returned to East Texas as an assistant pastor in Winona Texas, Higher Hope Fellowship church. serving there as an assistant pastor for the next seven-years.

Cumby founded his another church New Birth Fellowship Tyler Tx.  New Birth didn't make it, returning to Higher Hope Fellowship church where he currently serves.

Coaching career
After his NFL career, Cumby was the athletic director and coach at his high school alma mater, Bishop Thomas K. Gorman Catholic School, for the 2006 school year, and was recently the linebackers coach at Tyler Junior College.  He was the head football coach at Texas College for three seasons until August 2014. He also coaches at All Saints Episcopal School in Tyler, Texas. Later returned to coach at Bishop T.K. Gorman in 2021–22.

Head coaching record

College

References

External links
 

1956 births
Living people
American football linebackers
Buffalo Bills players
Green Bay Packers players
Oklahoma Sooners football players
Philadelphia Eagles players
Texas College Steers football coaches
High school football coaches in Texas
Junior college football coaches in the United States
Tyler Junior College alumni
All-American college football players
People from Henderson County, Texas
Sportspeople from Tyler, Texas
Players of American football from Texas
African-American coaches of American football
African-American players of American football
21st-century African-American people
20th-century African-American sportspeople